Francis Francis may refer to:
Francis Francis (cricketer) (1852–1926), English cricketer
Francis Francis (writer) (1822–1886), English writer on angling
Francis Francis (speedboat pilot) from Pete Bostwick
Francis Francis (golfer) from Omega European Masters

See also
FrancisFrancis, an Italian espresso machine manufacturer
Frank Francis (1901–1988), librarian and curator
Francis (disambiguation)